Breagyps is an extinct genus of New World vulture in the family Cathartidae.

References

Cathartidae
Prehistoric bird genera